Bull Creek railway station is a railway station on the Transperth network. It is located on the Mandurah line, 11.7 kilometres from Perth station inside the median strip of the Kwinana Freeway serving the suburb of Bull Creek.

History

The contract for the construction of Bull Creek railway station, along with Canning Bridge railway station and Murdoch railway station, was awarded to John Holland Pty Ltd in November 2004. This contract was the first contract awarded for the construction of stations on the Southern Suburbs Railway project, and it had a value of $32 million.

During planning, the station was projected to have 3,100 boardings per day upon opening.

Bull Creek station is situated in the Kwinana Freeway median strip, and perpendicular to the Leach Highway interchange. It also features integrated bus services on the concourse level; this level operates as a bus station. The station opened along with the rest of the Mandurah line on 23 December 2007.

Services
Bull Creek station is served by Transperth Mandurah line services.

Canning Bridge station saw 1,366,696 passengers in the 2013–14 financial year.

Platforms

Transfers
Bus transfers are available on the concourse level. The bus station is on a bridge structure extending over the Kwinana Freeway carriageways and train station. Traffic signals at both ends of the bridge have been modified to include a bus phase.

Bus routes

Stands 1–5

Stands 6–10

References

External links

Station map New MetroRail

Mandurah line
Railway stations in Perth, Western Australia
Railway stations in Australia opened in 2007
Bull Creek, Western Australia
Transperth railway stations in highway medians
Bus stations in Perth, Western Australia